is an onsen in the town of Hakone, Kanagawa Prefecture, Japan. The hot springs have been an attraction for tourists and pleasure-seekers for hundreds of years going back to the beginning of the Edo period. The town is situated on a plateau in the Haya River valley. Miyanoshita is one of the Seven Hot Springs of Hakone (Hakone Nanayu). During his tour of Japan in 1873 the Emperor Meiji stayed at a hotel here. The town is also home to the Sōtō temple Jōsen-ji.

See also
Fujiya Hotel
Miyanoshita Station

References
 Nagasaki University Library; Japanese Old Photographs in Bakumatsu-Meiji Period, "Miyanoshita Spa (4)". Accessed 22 December 2006.

External links 

Official website 
Hakone portal website
Hakone Onsen

Tourist attractions in Kanagawa Prefecture
Spa towns in Japan
Landforms of Kanagawa Prefecture
Hakone, Kanagawa
Populated places in Kanagawa Prefecture
Hot springs of Japan